The 2021–22 Hartford Hawks men's basketball team represented the University of Hartford in the 2021–22 NCAA Division I men's basketball season. The Hawks, led by 12th-year head coach John Gallagher, played their home games at Chase Arena in West Hartford, Connecticut, as members of the America East Conference. They finished the season 12–20, 9–9 in America East Play to finish a tie for fifth place. They defeated Albany in the quarterfinals of the America East tournament before losing in the semifinals to UMBC.

Previous season
In a season limited due to the ongoing COVID-19 pandemic, the Hawks finished the 2020–21 season 15–9, 8–6 in America East play to finish in fourth place. They defeated Binghamton, Albany, and Vermont to advance to the championship game of the America East tournament. There they defeated UMass Lowell to receive the conference's automatic bid the NCAA tournament the school's first-ever appearance in the NCAA Tournament. As the No. 16 seed in the South Region, they lost to eventual national champion Baylor in the first round.

Roster

Schedule and results

|-
!colspan=12 style=| Non-conference regular season

|-
!colspan=12 style=| America East regular season

|-
!colspan=9 style=|America East tournament

Sources

References

Hartford Hawks men's basketball seasons
Hartford Hawks
Hartford
Hartford